The individual dressage at the 2017 FEI European Championships in Gothenburg, Sweden was held at Ullevi from 19 to 25 August.

Germany's Isabell Werth won the gold medal in both Grand Prix Special and Grand Prix Freestyle. Sönke Rothenberger representing Germany won a silver medal in both Grand Prix Freestyle and Grand Prix Special. Cathrine Dufour of Denmark won a bronze in special and in the Freestyle as well. In the Grand Prix Germany won the golden team medal, while Denmark won the silver medal and Sweden bronze.

Competition format

The team and individual dressage competitions used the same results. Dressage had three phases. The first phase was the Grand Prix. Top 30 individuals advanced to the second phase, the Grand Prix Special where the first individual medals were awarded. The last set of medals at the 2019 European Dressage Championships was awarded after the third phase, the Grand Prix Freestyle where top 15 combinations competed, with a maximum of the three best riders per country. Two riders were ranked in the top 15, but because there were three other riders with a higher rank, they weren't able to compete in the Freestyle.

Judges
The following judges were appointed to officiate during the European Dressage Championships.

  Annette Fransen Iacobaeus (Ground Jury President)
  Evi Eisenhardt (Ground Jury Member)
  Anne Gribbons (Ground Jury Member)
  Isobel Wessels (Ground Jury Member)
  Hans-Christian Matthiesen (Ground Jury Member)
  Francis Verbeek- van Rooy (Ground Jury Member)
  Susan Hoevenaars (Ground Jury Member)
  Mariëtte Withages-Dieltjens (Technical Delegate)

Schedule

All times are Central European Summer Time (UTC+2)

Results

References

2017 in equestrian